St Johns Park is a suburb of Sydney, New South Wales, Australia.

St Johns Park or St. John's Park may also refer to:
 St Johns Park, Tasmania, a locality in Hobart
 St. John's Park, a former neighborhood of Manhattan, New York City
 St. John's Park (stadium), ground of Heather St John's F.C. in Heather, Leicestershire, England
 St. Johns Park (Portland, Oregon), a park
 James J. Walker Park or St. John's Park, a park in Manhattan, New York City
 St Johns Park High School, a high school in Sydney, New South Wales, Australia
 St. Johns Park, Flagler County, Florida, a community in Flagler County, Florida

See also
 Hudson Square, a nearby Manhattan neighborhood